The 2000 United States presidential election in Idaho took place on November 7, 2000, as part of the 2000 United States presidential election. Voters chose four representatives, or electors to the Electoral College, who voted for president and vice president.

Idaho is one of the most reliable red states in the country; in 2000, Republican George W. Bush easily carried the state, winning every congressional district, and every county except Blaine, which made him the first Republican to win the White House without carrying this county since William Howard Taft in 1908. In fact, Gore received more than forty percent of the vote in only one other county: Shoshone. Third party candidates received 5.2% of the vote.

Winning 67.17% of the vote, Idaho proved to be Bush's second strongest state in the 2000 election after neighboring Wyoming.

Results

Results by county

Counties that flipped from Democratic to Republican
Latah (Largest city: Moscow)
Nez Perce (Largest city: Lewiston)
Shoshone (Largest city: Kellogg)

Overview

By Congressional District
Bush won both congressional districts.

Electors

Technically the voters of Idaho cast their ballots for electors: representatives to the Electoral College. Idaho is allocated four electors because it has two congressional districts and two senators. All candidates who appear on the ballot or qualify to receive write-in votes must submit a list of four electors, who pledge to vote for their candidate and his or her running mate. Whoever wins a plurality of votes in the state is awarded all four electoral votes. Their chosen electors then vote for president and vice president. Although electors are pledged to their candidate and running mate, they are not obligated to vote for them. An elector who votes for someone other than his or her candidate is known as a faithless elector.

The electors of each state and the District of Columbia met on December 18, 2000 to cast their votes for president and vice president. The Electoral College itself never meets as one body. Instead the electors from each state and the District of Columbia met in their respective capitols. 

The following were the members of the Electoral College from the state. All were pledged to and voted for George W. Bush and Dick Cheney:
Phil Batt
Connie Hansen
James McClure
Orriette Sinclair

See also
 United States presidential elections in Idaho
 Presidency of George W. Bush

References

2000
Idaho
2000 Idaho elections